Elton is an unincorporated community in Cambria County, Pennsylvania, United States. Elton has a post office with ZIP code 15934.

References

Unincorporated communities in Cambria County, Pennsylvania
Unincorporated communities in Pennsylvania